is a junction passenger railway station located in the town of Sayō, Hyōgo Prefecture, Japan, jointly operated by West Japan Railway Company (JR West) and the third-sector railway operator Chizu Express.

Lines 

Station layout
The station consists of two island platforms connected by an underground passage.The station has a Midori no Madoguchi staffed ticket office.

Platforms

Adjacent stations

History
Sayo Station opened on 30 July 1935.

Passenger statistics
In fiscal 2019, the station was used by an average of 450 passengers daily.

Surrounding area
 Sayo Town Hall
 Hyogo Prefectural Sayo High School
 Sayo Municipal Sayo Elementary School

See also
List of railway stations in Japan

References

External links

 JR West station information 
  Chizu Express station information 

Railway stations in Hyōgo Prefecture
Railway stations in Japan opened in 1935
Kishin Line
Sayō, Hyōgo